The 1982 Individual Speedway World Championship was the 37th edition of the official World Championship to determine the world champion rider.

The 1982 World Final was held in Los Angeles in the United States. This was the only time the Individual World Final was held outside of England or Europe before the advent of the Speedway Grand Prix series in 1995.

The  speedway track for the Final was laid out over the Los Angeles Memorial Coliseum's existing athletics track. The event was held in front of a crowd of approximately 40,000 people, the largest ever motorcycle speedway attendance in the United States.

Controversy
Heat 14 of the championship proved to be the most controversial race of the night, and one of the most controversial heats in the whole of speedway history. After a slow start which saw defending champion Bruce Penhall, and England's Kenny Carter in 3rd and 4th places behind 1976 World Champion Peter Collins and Australian Phil Crump, both riders fought their way past Crump and into 2nd and 3rd behind Collins. Carter moved under Penhall into 2nd place at the end of the 2nd lap, and both riders proceeded to bump each other down the front straight with Carter emerging in front. Carter then went wide through turn 1 which allowed Penhall to come back underneath him. Carter then fell coming onto the back straight and went through the fence causing the race to be stopped. Norwegian referee Torrie Kittlesen then excluded Carter from the race for causing the stoppage. Carter protested claiming that Penhall had hit him in the corner causing him to come off his bike and walked back to the start line in an effort to stop the re-run going ahead without him. Officials and his manager Ivan Mauger were then forced to remove Carter from the track.

Although not shown in the television broadcast of the event, amateur video footage shot from the stands in turns 1 & 2 vindicated Kittlesen's decision. The footage showed that Penhall and Carter did not touch in the turn and that the Englishman had gone down on his own, though years later the debate still rages on about who was at fault. In a television interview with American broadcaster Ken Squier soon after the heat, Kittlesen told that he excluded Carter as he believed the Englishman had fallen without help from Penhall. He also said that the rough riding such as seen from Penhall and Carter on the front straight was to be expected in a World Final. Phil Crump, who had the best view of the incident as he was directly behind the pair, allegedly agreed with the decision to exclude Carter.

Penhall went on to win the re-run from Collins and Crump. In a twist, the result in the re-run ultimately cost Collins' younger brother Les the World Championship in what was his first and only World Final appearance. Had Penhall finished second in Heat 14 behind Peter Collins, and with later results, he and Les Collins could have finished with 13 points each which would have seen the pair in a runoff for the championship. Les Collins had inflicted Penhall's only loss of the meeting when he out-rode the American in Heat 4 in what many believe was a major upset. Additionally, if Penhall had been excluded from Heat 14 and not Carter, Les Collins would have a small chance of winning the title as he had finished with a 2 point lead over third placed American Dennis Sigalos, however Carter would have had a good chance of winning a re-run Heat 14 which would give him a two point advantage over Les Collins before they met, so Carter would have been favourite. Had Penhall only finished on 11 points he would have had a runoff with fellow American Kelly Moran for third place.

In another controversial decision, two races later Kittlesen excluded Czechoslovakia's Václav Verner after a clash with West Germany's Georg Hack, the incident being similar to the Penhall / Carter incident. However, on this occasion it was the rider who stayed on his bike, Verner, who was excluded (though video evidence available to Kittlesen at the time clearly showed Verner's back wheel taking out Hack's front wheel).

British Qualification

British Final
June 2, 1982
 Coventry, Brandon Stadium
First 8 to Overseas Final plus 1 reserve

Swedish Qualification

Australian Qualification

Australian Final

 March 13, 1982
  Brisbane

New Zealand Qualification

New Zealand Final

 27 February 1982
  Christchurch

Intercontinental Round

Danish Final

May 11, 1982
 Fredericia
First 6 to Nordic final

American Final
June 12, 1982
 Long Beach
First 3 to Overseas final plus 1 reserve

Nordic Final

July 4, 1982
 Fjelsted
First 6 to Intercontinental final + 1 reserve

Overseas Final
July 4, 1982
 London, White City Stadium
First 10 to Intercontinental final plus 1 reserve

Intercontinental Final
July 23, 1982
 Vetlanda
First 11 to World final plus 1 reserve

Continental Round

Continental Final
July 25, 1982
 Leszno 
First 5 to World final plus 1 reserve

World Final
 August 28, 1982
  Los Angeles, Memorial Coliseum
 Referee: Torrie Kittlesen
 Attendance: 40,000 (approx)

Television
During the meeting, scenes for an episode of the American television drama series CHiPs were filmed in the pits. One of the stars of CHiPs was World Champion Bruce Penhall who portrayed cadet–probationary officer Bruce Nelson. The episode centered on Nelson winning the World Final, with Penhall acting as Nelson in between races. Actual television coverage of the meeting was also used in the episode, with dubbed over commentary. The episode, which was episode 5 of season 6 ("Speedway Fever") aired in the USA on November 7, 1982, was Penhall's debut in the series.

Penhall later admitted that it felt strange having a bodyguard and having to do make up for shoots in between races, stating that he was nervous enough riding in the World Final in front of his home crowd without the pressure of a television acting debut.

References

1982
World Individual
1982 in sports in California
1982 in American motorsport
Speedway competitions in the United States